Pekaulang is an administrative division of the Maba district in East Halmahera Regency, North Maluku, Indonesia.

Buli, formerly Boeli is a village in Pekaulang. Most of the people in Buli are Christian and about a third of the population is Muslim.

See also
 Buli Airport

References

Populated places in North Maluku